The Lyceum was a temple dedicated to Apollo Lyceus ("Apollo the wolf-god").

It was best known for the Peripatetic school of philosophy founded there by Aristotle in 334 BC.  Aristotle fled Athens in 323 BC, and the university continued to function after his lifetime under a series of leaders until the Roman general Sulla destroyed it during his assault on Athens in 86 BC.

The remains of the Lyceum were discovered in modern Athens in 1996 in a park behind the Hellenic Parliament.

The Lyceum  

The Lyceum had been used for philosophical debate long before Aristotle. Philosophers such as Prodicus of Ceos, Protagoras, and numerous rhapsodes had spoken there. The most famous philosophers to teach there were Isocrates, Plato (of The Academy), and the best-known Athenian teacher, Socrates. In addition to military training and educational pursuits, the Lyceum also housed Athenian Assembly meetings before the Pnyx became the official meeting place in the fifth century BCE. Cult practices of various groups were also held at the Lyceum.

The Lyceum was named for the Greek god Apollo Lyceus. Initially a sanctuary made for worshiping Lyceus, it later became a public exercise area, with a gymnasium being constructed later on. It is unknown when this worship was introduced to Athens or when the Lyceum became the sanctuary.

The Lyceum was located outside and east of Athens's city wall. The Lyceum is famous for being a center of education, but it was used for numerous other activities including Athenian assembly gatherings, cult practices, and military exercises. Because the Lyceum had to serve many purposes, the building had to have specific structures developed to accommodate all the activities. The area it was built on had many open spaces with forests. It was bound on the south by the Ilissus river and the north by the mountain Lykabettus. There were many roads that led to the Lyceum from in the city and around the city. The area had increasing numbers of buildings constructed between the sixth century BC to sixth century AD. Overall it is thought that the Lyceum spanned north possibly to modern Kolonaki plateia, south as far as the Ilissos river. It spanned east through the modern national gardens and the city wall, close to modern Amelia's Boulevard, was the western boundary.

The Lyceum has been referenced in numerous ancient works of literature including stories by Plato, Strabo, and Xenophon. Plato mentions the Lyceum in his book Lysis, telling of Socrates walking down a road from the academy to the Lyceum to meet his friends Hippothales and Ktesippos close to the Panops springhouse. Strabo mentions the springhouse in his story and mentions that it is near the Lyceum and the Ilissus river flows from above the Agrai and the Lyceum. Lastly, Xenophon says that the Lyceum served as a meeting place for the Athenian troops when the Spartans raided the city from east of the city to their encampment at Dekelaia.    

Within the Lyceum were many areas serving different purposes. A few were the apodyterion, dromoi, peripatetic, palastra, and gymnasium. The apodyterion was a changing room that was either part of the gymnasium or the palmistry. The dromoi and peripatoi were roads that ran from the east to the west through the modern-day Syntagma square and Parliament building. The palaistra was a wrestling school that was used as the scene for Plato's Euthydemus. It served three functions: a training area, an area for cult activity, and a meeting place for philosophical discussion. The gymnasium was repaired in the 330s BC, but it is thought to have been originally built by Pericles in the fifth century or Pisistratus in the sixth century.

The Lyceum was used at a location for philosophical discussion before Aristotle's school was founded there. Socrates, Protagoras, and Prodicus of Chios travelled to the Lyceum during fifth century BC to teach, debate, and discuss their findings. Isocrates also taught rhetoric at the Lyceum during the fourth century BC. Aristotle returned to Athens in 335 BC and established a school in one of the buildings of the Lyceum, lecturing there as well as writing most of his books and collecting books for the first European library in history. Aristotle had always been a book collector and the library grew with the books Alexander sent him, he also sent plant and animal species that allows for Aristotle to open a museum. The library attracted many scholars to his school, and they become teachers and conducted research. Students were able to study any subject available at the time. His school was compared to a factory that made professionals of any kind.

Aristotle's school and library 

In 335 BCE, Athens fell under Macedonian rule and Aristotle, aged 50, returned from Asia. Upon his return, Aristotle began teaching regularly in the morning in the Lyceum and founded an official school called "The Lyceum". After morning lessons, Aristotle would frequently lecture on the grounds for the public, and manuscripts of his compiled lectures were eventually circulated. The group of scholars who followed the Aristotelian doctrine came to be known as the Peripatetics due to Aristotle's tendency to walk as he taught.

Aristotle's main focus as a teacher was cooperative research, an idea which he founded through his natural history work and systematic collection of philosophical works to contribute to his library. His students were assigned historical or scientific research projects as part of their studies.  The school was also student run.  The students elected a new student administrator to work with the school leadership every ten days, allowing all the students to become involved in turn. Before returning to Athens, Aristotle had been the tutor of Alexander of Macedonia, who became the great conqueror Alexander the Great.

Throughout his conquests of various regions, Alexander collected plant and animal specimens for Aristotle's research, allowing Aristotle to develop the first zoo and botanical garden in existence.  It is also suspected that Alexander donated what would be the equivalent of more than 4 million dollars to the Lyceum. In , Aristotle was forced to flee Athens with his family when the political leadership reacted against the Macedonians again and his previously published works supporting Macedonian rule left him a target.  He passed on his Lyceum to Theophrastus and died later that year in Chalcis, near his hometown.

History of Aristotle's library
Theophrastus placed a provision in his will that left the Lyceum library, which at this point included both his and Aristotle's work as well as student research, philosophical historical texts and histories of philosophy, to his supposed follower, Neleus.  However, the seniors of the Lyceum placed Strato as the next leader and upon his retirement from the school in the mid third century BCE, Neleus divorced the Lyceum from its library and took all of the books with him to Skepsis in Mysia. Neleus was an expert on Theophrastus and Aristotle, and it may be that Theophrastus hoped he would prepare a catalogue of the 10,000 rolls of papyrus. At least some of the books seem to have been sold to the library in Alexandria.  In the tenth century, a catalogue of the library revealed manuscripts by both Theophrastus and Aristotle which almost had to have been obtained from Neleus. The rest seem to have been hidden by his family, known for their ignorance.

The library then disappeared for several centuries until it appears to have been bought from Neleus's heirs in the first century BCE and returned to the school. However, when Sulla attacked Athens, the books were shipped to Rome. Throughout their travels one fifth of Aristotle's works were lost and thus are not a part of the modern Aristotelian collection. Since then, the remaining works have been translated and widely distributed, providing much of the modern knowledge of ancient Western philosophy.

The Lyceum after Aristotle 

As head of the Lyceum, Theophrastus continued Aristotle's foci of observation, collaborative research and documentation of philosophical history, thus making his own contributions to the library, most notably as the first organizer of botany.
Theophrastus continued his own work while teaching and demonstrated his devotion to learning and education by leaving the land of the Lyceum to his friends to continue their work in education in philosophy in the non-private tradition of the school upon his death.

The school was closed for a year when all foreign philosophers were required to leave Athens. It seems to have gone into decline from c. 300, and to have more or less disintegrated sometime after  when its last certain scholar, Lyco of Troas, died and left the Lyceum not to one man but to all his colleagues.

Leaders of the Lyceum
There is some speculation that both Aristotle and Theophrastus were buried in the gardens of the Lyceum, though no graves have been positively identified. Theophrastus was followed by Strato of Lampsacus, who served as head until 268. Lyco of Troas, likely Aristo of Ceos, Critolaus, Diodorus of Tyre and Erymneus were the next several heads of the school. Additionally, Andronicus of Rhodes served as the eleventh head.

Members of the Lyceum
At various points in the history of the Lyceum, numerous scholars and students walked its peripatoi, though some of the most notable include Eudemus, a mathematical historian, Aristoxenus, who wrote works on music, and Dicaearchus, a prolific writer on topics including ethics, politics, psychology and geography. Additionally, medical historian Meno, and an eventual ruler of Athens, Demetrius of Phaleron, spent time at the school.

Aristotle's Lyceum today 
The location of Lyceum is: .

During a 1996 excavation to clear space for Athens' new Museum of Modern Art, the remains of Aristotle's Lyceum were uncovered.  Descriptions from the works of ancient heirs hint at the location of the grounds, speculated to be somewhere just outside the eastern boundary of ancient Athens, near the rivers Ilissos and Eridanos, and close to Lycabettus Hill. The excavation site is located in downtown Athens, by the junction of Rigillis and Vasilissis Sofias Streets, next to the Athens War Museum and the National Conservatory. The first excavations revealed a gymnasium and wrestling area, but further work has uncovered the majority of what is believed to have withstood the erosion caused to the region by nearby architecture's placement and drainage.  The buildings are definitely those of the original Lyceum, as their foundations lie on the bedrock and there are no other strata further below. Upon realizing the magnitude of the discovery, contingency plans were made for a nearby construction of the Art Museum so that it could be combined with a Lyceum outdoor museum and give visitors easy access to both. There are plans for canopies to be placed over the Lyceum remains, and the area was opened to the public in 2009.

See also 
 School of Aristotle 
 Lyceum movement
 Platonic Academy
 Cynosarges
 Theophrastus

References

Citations

Sources
 "Aristotle". Foundations of Agricultural and Extension Education. Raleigh, North Carolina: NC State University College of Agriculture and Life Sciences. Fall 2009. Archived from the original on 25 November 2009. Retrieved 30 October 2009.
 "Aristotle's Lyceum opens to the public". Greece National Tourist Office. 2014. Retrieved 22 November 2016.
 "Aristotle's School"[permanent dead link] at the Portland State University Greek Civilization website, Portland State University, n.d. Web. 30 October 2009.
 "Lyceum of Aristotle in Athens to open to public as archaeological site". Archived from the original on 2 March 2012. Retrieved 27 October 2011.
 "Lyceum." Science in the Ancient World: An Encyclopedia. Santa Barbara: ABC-CLIO, 2004. Credo Reference. Web. 31 October 2009.
 "Lyceum." The Cambridge Dictionary of Philosophy. Cambridge: Cambridge University Press, 1999. Credo Reference. Web. 30 October 2009.
 Baez, Fernando (2008). A Universal History of the Destruction of Books. New York: Atlas and Company. pp. 58–60. .
 Gross, Charles G. (29 June 2016). "Aristotle on the Brain:". The Neuroscientist. doi:10.1177/107385849500100408.
 Isle, Mick (15 December 2005). Aristotle: Pioneering Philosopher and Founder of the Lyceum. The Rosen Publishing Group, Inc. .
 Lindberg, David C. (2007) [1992]. "4: Hellenistic Natural Philosophy". The Beginnings of Western Science (2nd ed.). Chicago: University of Chicago Press. .
 Lynch, John Patrick (1972). Aristotle's School: a Study of a Greek Educational Institution. University of California Press. .
 Morison, William (2006). "The Lyceum". Internet Encyclopedia of Philosophy. Retrieved 30 October 2009.
 Morison, William. "Palaestrae". Internet Encyclopedia of Philosophy: A Peer-Reviewed Academic Resource.
 Morison, William. "The Lyceum". Internet Encyclopedia of Philosophy: A Peer-Reviewed Academic Resource.
 Stenudd, Stefan, "Aristotle: His Life, Time, and Work", Stennud. N.p., n.d. Web. 30 October 2009.

External links 

Aristotle
Schools in Greece
Defunct schools in Greece
4th-century BC establishments in Greece
1st-century BC disestablishments in Greece
86 BC
Education in Athens
Education in classical antiquity
Ancient Greek buildings and structures in Athens
Educational institutions established in the 4th century BC
Ancient libraries
330s BC establishments
Gymnasiums (ancient Greece)
Lyceums